Trazo is a municipality of northwestern Spain in the province of A Coruña, in the autonomous community of Galicia. It is located in the comarca de Ordes.

The Tambre River on the south serves as a boundary with the Santiago de Compostela municipality.

References

External links
 Trazo Council

Municipalities in the Province of A Coruña